Carboniferous tetrapods include amphibians and reptiles that lived during the Carboniferous Period. Though stem-tetrapods originated in the preceding Devonian, it was in the earliest Carboniferous that the first crown tetrapods appeared, with full scaleless skin and five digits.

During this time, amphibians (including many extinct groups unrelated to modern forms, referred to as "basal tetrapods") were the predominant tetrapods, and included the Temnospondyli, Lepospondyli, and Anthracosauria.  The first amniotes appeared during the middle Carboniferous (Early Pennsylvanian) from the lattermost group, and included both sauropsids and synapsids, but it was not until the very end of the Carboniferous, during a rainforest collapse, and afterwards that they began to diversify.

Classification 
The following list of families of Carboniferous tetrapods is based mostly on Benton ed. 1993.  The classification follows Benton 2004:

Superclass Tetrapoda
 Basal Tetrapods
 Family Whatcheeriidae
 Family Crassigyrinidae
 Family Baphetidae (Loxommatidae)
 Family Colosteidae
 Family Caerorhachidae
 Class Amphibia 
 Order Temnospondyli
 Family Dendrerpetontidae
 Family Cochleosauridae
 Family Trimerorhachidae
 Family Eugyrinidae
 Family Saurerpetontidae
 Family Eryopidae
 Family Trematopidae
 Family Dissorophidae
 Family Micromelerpetontidae
 Family Branchiosauridae
 Family Amphibamidae
 Superorder Lepospondyli
 Incertae Sedis
 Family Acherontiscidae
 Family Adelogyrinidae
 Order Aïstopoda
 Family Ophiderpetontidae
 Family Phlegethontiidae
 Order Nectridea
 Family Diplocaulidae
 Family Scincosauridae
 Family Urocordylidae
 Order Microsauria
 Utaherpeton
 Family Microbrachidae
 Family Hyloplesiontidae
 Family Odonterpetontidae
 Family Tuditanidae
 Family Pantylidae
 Family Gymnarthridae
 Family Trihecatontidae
 Family Cocytinidae
 Superorder Reptiliomorpha
 Order/suborder uncertain (incerti (sub)ordinis)
 Family Solenodonsauridae
 Westlothiana
 Order Anthracosauria
 Family Eoherpetontidae
 Family Proterogyrinidae
 Family Anthracosauridae
 Family Eogyrinidae
 Family Archeriidae
 Order Gephyrostegida
 Family Gephyrostegidae
 Order Seymouriamorpha
 Family Discosauriscidae
 Order Diadectomorpha
 Family Limnoscelididae
 Family Diadectidae

Series Amniota
 Class Sauropsida
 Basal Eureptilia
 Family Captorhinidae
 Family Protorothyrididae
 Subclass Diapsida
 Order Araeoscelidia
 Family Petrolacosauridae
 Class Synapsida
 Order Pelycosauria
 Family Varanopidae
 Family Ophiacodontidae
 Family Edaphosauridae
 Family Sphenacodontidae

See also 
 List of Permian tetrapods
 List of Devonian tetrapods

References 

 Benton, M. J. (2004), Vertebrate Paleontology, 3rd ed. Blackwell Science Ltd
 ----- (editor), (1993) The fossil record II. London: Chapman and Hall.